Astrid Fina Paredes (born 16 October 1983 in Barcelona) is a Spanish Paralympic snowboarder. Her greatest achievement has been the silver medal of the World Cup of snowboarding.

Tragedy

Astrid Fina had her right foot amputated as a result of a motorcycle accident in May 2009. In 2011, she started practicing snowboarding. A year later, in 2012, she was already part of the Spanish national team.

Recipients

In 2015, she achieved the fourth place in the World Cup, won gold in the Spanish championships, the second place in the national openings of Italy and was the winner in the French.

In the 2017 World Cup he has achieved a plant medal in the four events of the category with amputation SB-LL2 (LW2) in which he participated, two of snowboardcross and two of banked slalom.

She participated in the 2014 Winter Paralympics in Sochi, where she obtained an Olympic diploma with his sixth position in snowboardcross,  and is one of the three Spanish representatives participating in the 2018 Winter Paralympics in Pyeongchang. She will be the flag bearer in the opening ceremony.

Notes

References

External links
 
 Astrid Fina Paredes at World Para Snowboard
 
 https://web.archive.org/web/20180211010655/http://www.sbesmag.com/2015/04/desayunando-con-astrid-fina-todo-un-ejemplo-de-superacion/
 http://www.marca.com/paralimpicos/2017/12/13/5a312a7422601d9f798b45ae.html
 https://espanol.eurosport.com/juegos-olimpicos/pyeongchang/2018/astrid-fina-en-rumbo-a-pyeongchang-cambien-un-pie-por-una-vida-mejor_sto6427486/story.shtml

1983 births
Living people
Spanish female snowboarders
Paralympic snowboarders of Spain
Paralympic medalists in snowboarding
Paralympic bronze medalists for Spain
Snowboarders at the 2014 Winter Paralympics
Snowboarders at the 2018 Winter Paralympics
Medalists at the 2018 Winter Paralympics
Sportspeople from Barcelona